Harlem United FC is a Dominica football club based in Newtown. The club competes in the Dominica Premier Division League, the top tier of Dominica football.

The club is the most successful club in Dominica, winning the Premier Division League a record 20 times.

Harlem United called Harlem Rovers until 1978 and Harlem Bombers until 2002.

Honors 
Dominica Championship: 20
 1970, 1972, 1973, 1974, 1981, 1983, 1985, 1989, 1992, 1993, 1994, 1995, 1997, 1999, 2000, 2001, 2003, 2004, 2006, 2011/12
Dominica Knock-Out Tournament: 13
 1970, 1971, 1973, 1974, 1976, 1978, 1980, 1984, 1992, 1994, 1997, 2003, 2004

References 

Football clubs in Dominica